The 1981 Parramatta Eels season was the 35th in the club's history. Coached by Jack Gibson and captained by Steve Edge, they competed in the 1981 NSWRFL Premiership.

Standings

References

Parramatta Eels seasons
Parramatta Eels season
Parramatta Eels season